Ivan Boras (born 31 October 1991) is a Croatian football defender, currently playing for Devetka.

References
 
 

1991 births
Living people
Footballers from Zagreb
Association football midfielders
Association football fullbacks
Croatian footballers
Croatia under-21 international footballers
NK Lokomotiva Zagreb players
HNK Rijeka players
GNK Dinamo Zagreb players
GNK Dinamo Zagreb II players
NK Krško players
Croatian Football League players
First Football League (Croatia) players
Slovenian Second League players
Croatian expatriate footballers
Expatriate footballers in Slovenia
Croatian expatriate sportspeople in Slovenia